Phryganopteryx rothschildi is a moth in the subfamily Arctiinae. It was described by Hervé de Toulgoët in 1958. It is found on Madagascar.

Subspecies
Phryganopteryx rothschildi rothschildi
Phryganopteryx rothschildi colorata Toulgoët, 1971

References

Moths described in 1958
Taxa named by Hervé de Toulgoët
Phryganopterygina